Paul Léon (2 October 1874, Rueil-Malmaison - 1 August 1962, Chantilly) was a French art professor and historiographer.

Biography
He spent his childhood in Vosges, where his family originated. He attended college in Épinal. After receiving his baccalauréat, he continued his studies at the Lycée Condorcet. He passed his examinations and became an agrégé in 1898. After a few years of teaching, he was employed by the Ministry of Public Works, then became a contributor and staff member at the Annales de géographie.  

In 1905, he found a position as chief-of-staff to the Undersecretary of State for Fine Arts, . They had a son and a daughter. In 1907, he became chief of the architectural division at the Undersecretariat; a division he helped to create. In 1919, he was named the Director of Fine Arts and, in 1928, the Director General. During that time, in 1922, he was elected to the Académie des Beaux-Arts, where he took Seat #6 in the "Unattached" section. He would hold that position until his death, forty years later.

He retired from his functions as Director General in 1933, to become a professor at the Collège de France; teaching the history of monumental art. He also served as the principal historiographer in the service of France's Monuments Historiques. As were thousands of others, he was seriously affected by the "racial laws" of 1940/41, and took refuge in the zone libre.  After the fall of the Vichy government, he was officially retired from the Collège.

During his retirement, he was a conservator at the Musée Condé in Chantilly, and President of the Artistic Council of the Réunion des Musées Nationaux. He wrote numerous books on the history of Paris and historical monuments.

References

Further reading 
 Camille Bidaud, Paul Léon et la restauration monumentale, l'exemple de Saint-Rémi de Reims, thesis from the École Nationale Supérieure d'Architecture de Paris-Belleville, under the direction of Jean-Philippe Garric, 2012
 Françoise Berce, "L’œuvre de Paul Léon (1874-1962)" in Pour une histoire des politiques du patrimoine, P. Poirrier and L. Vadelorge (Eds.),, Comité d’histoire du ministère de la culture, 2003, pp.227-251
 Raymond Cogniat, "Mort de Paul Léon" (obituary), In: Le Figaro, 8 August 1962
 Georges Wildenstein, "Paul Léon, directeur des Beaux-Arts sous 58 ministres", In La Chronique des Arts, supplement to La Gazette des Beaux-arts, September 1962

External links 

 Ministère de la Culture et de la Communication, "Paul Léon, Administrateur des arts et du patrimoine"



1874 births
1962 deaths
French art historians
French historiographers
Members of the Académie des beaux-arts
French art directors
People from Rueil-Malmaison